The Pine River, also known as the White Pine River, is a  tributary of the Saint Louis River in Minnesota, United States.

The White Pine River flows through Grand Lake Township, Solway Township, and Brevator Township.  The river is located west and northwest of Duluth, and north of Cloquet.  The river is located entirely within southern Saint Louis County.

See also
List of rivers of Minnesota

References

Rivers of Minnesota
Rivers of St. Louis County, Minnesota
Northern Minnesota trout streams